State Route 260, also known as SR 260, is a  long east–west major state highway in the north-central part of the U.S. state of Arizona.  It connects State Route 89A in Cottonwood to U.S. Route 180 and U.S. Route 191 in Eagar. The highway begins in Yavapai County before entering Coconino County and then entering Gila County before reentering Coconino County and then entering Navajo and Apache counties, where the highway ends.

Route description
The western terminus of SR 260 is located at State Route 89A in Cottonwood and heads eastbound along much of the Mogollon Rim, finally ending at its junction with U.S. Route 180 and U.S. Route 191 in Eagar.  SR 260 is part of the National Highway System between Show Low and Payson.

Stretches of this highway are known by various names, include Camp Verde Bridgeport Highway, General George Crook Trail, Zane Grey Highway, Camp Verde-Payson Highway, and White Mountain Road / Boulevard.  The northernmost stretch between Cottonwood and Camp Verde was originally State Route 279, while the original stretch of road from Payson to Eagar was originally State Route 160.

SR 260 was scheduled in 1995, to be widened and upgraded between Payson and Heber-Overgaard to a four lane divided highway with bridges over wildlife corridors to reduce accidents with deer/elk and other wildlife.  The road project has never been completed and is still two lanes over much of the route and is congested at times during holiday weekends with traffic from the Phoenix area to areas along the eastern Rim. Care must be observed due to narrow two lanes and wildlife crossing the road. It is also closed during winter storms because of its elevation changes between Payson and Show Low.

History
SR 260 was originally designated in 1955 as SR 160 from Payson to Show Low. In 1969, US 160 extended into Arizona so SR 160 was renumbered to SR 260 to avoid confusion. In 1972, it extended east to Eagar, replacing SR 173 and part of SR 73. On December 15, 1989, SR 260 extended west to Cottonwood over SR 279.

Junction list

References

External links

SR 260 at Arizona Roads

260
260
260
Transportation in Yavapai County, Arizona
Transportation in Coconino County, Arizona
Transportation in Gila County, Arizona
Transportation in Navajo County, Arizona
Transportation in Apache County, Arizona